, is a junction station on the Osaka Monorail Main Line and the Hankyu Kyoto Line. The station is located in Ibaraki, Osaka, Japan.

The shopping area around the stations include a few convenience stores, a Seattle's Best Coffee store, a couple of supermarkets and a post office. The station is surrounded by low price apartment complexes (danchi) and a few commercial buildings.

Layout
Hankyu Kyoto Line (Station No. HK-68)
two side platforms with two tracks on the ground

Osaka Monorail Main Line (Station No. 19)
an island platform with two tracks elevated

History
The station of the Hankyu line opened on March 8, 1970, and provided bus connection for passengers visiting Expo '70 (held March 15, 1970, through September 13, 1970). Unlike temporary Bankokuhaku Nishiguchi Station on the Senri Line (near present Yamada Station), which was open only during the Expo, Minami-Ibaraki Station was built as a permanent station.

The monorail station opened on June 1, 1990.

Station numbering was introduced to all Hankyu stations on 21 December 2013 with this station being designated as station number HK-68.

Surroundings
Hankyu Nissho Store
Hankyu Oasis
Hitachi Maxell

Adjacent stations

References

External links

 Minami-Ibaraki Station (Hankyu) 
 Route • Area Guide - Minami-Ibaraki Station (Osaka Monorail) 

Ibaraki, Osaka
Railway stations in Japan opened in 1970
Hankyu Kyoto Main Line
Railway stations in Osaka Prefecture